Florian Heinrich (born August 31, 1995) is an Austrian footballer.

External links
 
 bundesliga.at profile 

1995 births
Living people
Austrian footballers
Floridsdorfer AC players
Association football defenders